Wasteland is a monthly comic book series written by Antony Johnston, drawn by Christopher Mitten with covers by Ben Templesmith, and published by Oni Press. It debuted in July 2006 and ended in April 2015.

The series is set one hundred years after the Big Wet, an unspecified disaster that destroyed modern society and, it is assumed, changed the world's coastlines. The story takes place somewhere in America, now a barren desert and dustbowl without modern technology. The seas are poisonous, and subsistence farming with small amounts of livestock appears to be the norm.

The book also has theme music, composed and performed by Johnston, which can be downloaded from the official website.

Format 
Each issue of Wasteland is 32 pages long (with the exception of issue #1, which was a special double length premiere) and contains 22 pages of comic story, one episode of the prose serial travelogue Walking The Dust, a letters column and preview page for the following issue. The remainder of the pages are taken up by ads, normally for other series from Oni Press and/or by Wasteland'''s creators.

The letters column sometimes contains pieces of submitted fan art, and Johnston himself often answers the letters.

 The Big Wet 
The most-seen explanation for the apocalypse comes from the Sunner religion, a sect that worships Mother Sun and Father Moon. According to their legend, the Big Wet was a retribution on the people of A-Ree-Yass-I for shunning the 'gifts' Mother Sun and Father Moon offered them.  It seems as though this mythic place's name is a play on words by the author, and a linguistic contraction in-world, for "Area 1/I" (or perhaps "Area SI" = Area 51)—a military base/lab where the bomb was created.

 Storylines 
Thus far, the comic has established two distinct storylines. The first follows a scavenger named Michael who roams the wasteland, trading what he can salvage. His life changes forever when he finds a machine that talks in a forgotten language, supposedly giving directions to the fabled land of A-Ree-Yass-I, where mankind's downfall began. Michael tries to trade the machine at a small town of Sunners called Providence, and his fate becomes intertwined with the town's sheriff, Abi.

The second storyline follows the political machinations of a large city known as Newbegin, where the city's leader Marcus (aka Lord Founder) is oppressing the Sunner population, most of whom are slaves.

 Sunner beliefs 
Sunners have been shown to hold the following beliefs:
They worship 'Mother Sun' and 'Father Moon'
They cremate their dead in the open air
They are pacifists (though they appear to make exceptions for non-human creatures)
Fires are considered a form of tribute to their gods

 Language 
Many words and phrases from our own time have changed to fit the world of Wasteland'', and writer Antony Johnston has stated in interviews that the comic's language is carefully constructed.

For example, many epithets involving animals have become solely references to goats – "Son of a goat", "Goatshit", "I'll be a goat's uncle", and so on. No reference has yet been made in the book to Christ or Jesus; although God is mentioned in "Walking the Dust" text pieces, and issue 14 (set 55 years after the big wet) there is a priest who wears a cross, carries a bible, and refers to himself as a member of the "Cross Chain" religion. The names of places and cities are new or changed ("Providence" is almost certainly not Providence, Rhode Island due to its non-coastal location, and one as yet unseen prominent city is referred to as "Wosh-Tun"). Although the book clearly states it is set "Somewhere in America", no character has yet named the country as such, instead referring to their location simply as "the country" or even "the world". It is therefore assumed that place names have been lost and/or forgotten.

Based on the geographic descriptions in the "Walking the Dust" essays, accompanying the first 15 issues, it's likely that "Wosh-Tun" is Washington, DC. It's mentioned that east of Wosh-Tun lies the Black Water that separates the main land from the East Reach. The East Reach is connected by a landbridge to the mainland, which lies north of Wosh-Tun. It's possible that the Black Water is Chesapeake Bay and the East Reach is Delaware. West of Wosh-Tun lie the Suntop Peaks, which stretch far to the south, ending in a large peninsula. This could be a reference to the Allegheny Mountains and Florida.

Some words have the suffix "-age" added to them.

Collections
Oni are releasing trade paperback collections on an ongoing basis.

Issue #7 'Children of the Sun' and Issue #14 'Death Walks Behind You', #20, #25, #32, #39, #45 and #52 were stand alone stories.

The series was afflicted by serious delays after issue #26. Issue #27, originally planned for July 2009 was delayed to January 2010, mainly due to Johnston's involvement with Dead Space, Dead Space: Extraction and other projects.

As of July 2009, Oni are also releasing hardcover collections.

Awards
 2006: Nominated for "Best New Series" Harvey Awards
 2007: Nominated for "Favourite Black and White Comicbook – American" Eagle Award

References

External links
 – author's website

Interviews
CCI, Day 2 – The Future Is Now: Antony Johnston's "Wasteland", Comic Book Resources, July 16, 2005
The Rising Tide: Antony Johnston talks Oni's "Wasteland", Comic Book Resources, April 25, 2006
Post-Apocalypse Now: Johnston's "Wasteland", Comic Book Resources, December 19, 2006
Exploring the Wasteland with Antony Johnston, Newsarama, December 20, 2006
Interview with Antony Johnston podcast at ComiXology, January 21, 2008]
Antony Johnston talks "Dead Space," "Wasteland", Comic Book Resources, February 4, 2008

2006 comics debuts
Oni Press titles
Dystopian comics
Western (genre) comics